{{DISPLAYTITLE:C13H11NO2}}
The molecular formula C13H11NO2 (molar mass: 213.232 g/mol, exact mass: 213.0790 u) may refer to:

 Fenamic acid, or fenamate
 Salicylanilide

Molecular formulas